Urozhaynoye is a rural locality (a selo) in Dalnevostochny Selsoviet of Romnensky District, Amur Oblast, Russia. The population was 4 as of 2018. There are  2 streets.

Geography 
Urozhaynoye is located 56 km southwest of Romny (the district's administrative centre) by road. Pereyaslovka is the nearest rural locality.

References 

Rural localities in Romnensky District